The 1977 Asian Men's Handball Championship was the first Asian Championship, which took place from 26 March 4 April 1977 in Kuwait City, Kuwait.

Preliminary round
The top two finishers from each preliminary round group progressed to the next round.

Final round

Semifinals

Bronze medal match

Gold medal match

Final standing

References
Results

Handball
Asian Handball Championships
A
Handball
Asian Men's Handball Championship, 1977
Asian Men's Handball Championship
Asian Men's Handball Championship